The men's 60 kg competition at the 2022 European Judo Championships was held on 29 April at the Armeets Arena.

Results

Finals

Repechage

Pool A

Pool B

Pool C

Pool D

References

External links
 

M60
European Judo Championships Men's Extra Lightweight